Mylon maimon, the common mylon or black-veined mylon, is a butterfly of the  family Hesperiidae. It is found from Argentina to Colombia and Bolivia, and north to Mexico. It is found at heights ranging from sea level to about 1,800 meters.

External links
Butterflies of the Amazon rainforest

Erynnini
Hesperiidae of South America
Butterflies described in 1870
Taxa named by Samuel Hubbard Scudder